Şəfibəyli or Shafibeili or Shafibeyli may refer to:
Şəfibəyli, Goranboy, Azerbaijan
Şəfibəyli, Zangilan, Azerbaijan